Hallet may refer to:


Places
 Cape Hallett, Northern Victoria Land, the location of a scientific base in Antarctica
 Hallett, South Australia, Australia
 Halletts Bay, on the eastern shore of Lake Taupo in New Zealand

United States
 Hallett, Missouri
 Hallett, Oklahoma
 Hallett Nature Sanctuary, New York City, US
 Hallett Peak, a mountain in Colorado's Rocky Mountain National Park, USA

Other uses
 Hallett (surname)

See also
 Hallett Cove (disambiguation)
 
 Hallet (disambiguation)
 Hallatt (disambiguation)
 Hallettsville